Sugartooth is the first album by alternative rock band Sugartooth. It was released on 12 April 1994. The song Sold My Fortune became a minor hit having aired on an episode of Beavis and Butt-head.  This album features drummer Joey Castillo, later of Danzig and Queens Of The Stone Age.

Track listing
 Sold My Fortune
 Barrel
 Cracks in the Pavement
 Tuesday Morning
 In Need
 Leave My Soul to Rest
 Third-Day-to-Forever
 Black Queen
 Between the Illness
 Shine Boy
 Sheffield Milestone
 Gather Me/Ode
 Sound of Her Laughter

Personnel
Marc Hutner - vocals, guitar
Timothy Michael Gruse - guitar
Joey Castillo - drums
Josh Blum - bass

References

External links
 Sugartooth at Allmusic
 Sugartooth (Official Website)

Sources
 https://www.amazon.co.uk/Sugartooth/dp/B000003TAV/ref=sr_1_5?ie=UTF8&s=music&qid=1221848377&sr=8-5

1994 debut albums
Sugartooth albums
Geffen Records albums